is a Japanese type of infant spirit or ghost. It is a yōkai that appeared illustrated in Toriyama Sekien's mid-Edo period Konjaku Gazu Zoku Hyakki, as an infant spirit lapping oil out of an andon lamp.

Sekien's accompanying notes describe it:

In those books, it is stated that there was a folk belief where an oil merchant from Ōtsu, Ōmi Province steals oil from a Jizō statue at the crossroads so that he can sell them, and became lost and turned into a mysterious fire after death. In Mount Hiei, it is said that a mysterious fire called the abura-bō appears, and in the Shokoku Rijin Dan, this fire is seen to be the same as the "abura-nusumi no hi." It is inferred that Sekien's abura-akago was a made-up tale based on this "abura-nusumi no hi" in the Shokoku Rijin Dan and other books.

In more modern yōkai literature, it is interpreted that this yōkai takes on the appearance of a ball of flames and flies into people's houses, shapeshifts into that of a baby and licks the lanterns (andon lanterns), and returns to being a ball of fire and leaves. There's the theory that in the countryside in the past, unrefined materials like fish oil were used, so when cats licked the lamps, they might have looked like an abura-akago (baby licking an oil lamp).

Resembling this interpretation, in the book Tōhoku Kaidan no Tabi by the novelist Yamada Norio, a collection of kaidan, there was one Akita Prefecture kaidan titled "abura-name akago" (oil-licking baby) in which a baby-carrying woman in Akida stayed at the house of a shōya, and there the baby sucked completely dry all the oil of a lantern. Specialists have pointed out that Tōhoku Kaidan no Tabi includes many Sekien-created yōkai that have not originated from folklore, leading to the theory that this "abura-name akago" was also created based on Sekien's abura-akago.

Like the abura-nase and the ubagabi, there are many yōkai legends related to an attachment to oil. In this background, oil was a valuable resource used as food and as illumination in Japan, becoming even more of a necessity since the middle ages due to an improvement in refining technology, leading to the theory that these yōkai were born as a warning against wasting oil by licking and sucking it.

References

Sources
 
 
 

 

 http://www.obakemono.com/obake/aburaakago/ The Obakemono Project: Abura akago
  

Yōkai